Marc-Antoine Laugier (Manosque, Provence, January 22, 1713 – Paris, April 5, 1769) was a Jesuit priest until 1755 than a Benedictine monk. He was one of the first architectural theorist.

Laugier is best known for his Essay on Architecture published in 1753. In 1755 he published the second edition with a famous, often reproduced illustration of a primitive hut.  His approach is to discuss some familiar aspects of Renaissance and post-Renaissance architectural practice, which he describes as 'faults'.  These 'faults' induce his commentary on columns, the entablature, and on pediments.

Among faults he lists for columns are that of "being engaged in the wall", the use of pilasters, incorrect entasis (swelling of the column), and setting columns on pedestals.  Being embedded in the wall detracts from the overall beauty and aesthetic nature of columns; Laugier states that columns should be free.  He goes on to assert that the use of pilasters should strictly be frowned upon especially since in nearly every case columns could be used instead.  The second fault is created by incorrect proportion, and the last he believes is more of an unintelligible design.  Resting columns on pedestals, he says, is like adding a second set of legs beneath the first pair.

The Essai sur l'architecture includes his thoughts on several other topics, ranging from solidity, the different orders, and how to construct different buildings.

With the collaboration of the journalist and theatre historian Antoine de Léris and  Antoine Jacques Labbet, abbé de Morambert, he edited the first French review of music, Sentiment d'un harmonophile sur différents ouvrages de musique ("Amsterdam", i.e. Paris:Jombert, 1756).

Notes

 

1713 births
1769 deaths
18th-century French Jesuits
French Benedictines
French architecture writers
French architectural historians
French male non-fiction writers